Parcova is a commune in Edineț District, Moldova. It is composed of two villages, Fîntîna Albă and Parcova.

References

Communes of Edineț District